Gary Murdock is a former Scotland international rugby league footballer, and coach. He played at club level for the Ellenborough Rangers, and coached at club level for Workington Town, and the Cockermouth Titans.

International honours
Gary Murdock won caps for Scotland while at Ellenborough Rangers 1996 1-cap (sub).

References

Living people
English people of Scottish descent
English rugby league coaches
English rugby league players
Place of birth missing (living people)
Rugby league players from Cumbria
Scotland national rugby league team players
Workington Town coaches
Year of birth missing (living people)